The 2016–17 Danish Cup was the 63rd season of the Danish Cup competition. Copenhagen won the tournament, earning qualification into the second qualifying round of the 2017–18 UEFA Europa League. However, as Copenhagen also won the 2016–17 Danish Superliga, Brøndby, the cup runners-up, were allotted the position.

Structure
In the first round, there were 96 teams. 61 coming from the qualifiers among series teams in season 2016-17 with DBU Bornholm (1 team), DBU Fyn (10 teams), DBU Jutland (21 teams) DBU Copenhagen (11 teams), DBU Lolland-Falster (4 teams) and DBU Zealand (14 teams). An additional 23 teams come from the 2015-16 Danish 2nd Divisions and 10 teams from the 2015-16 Danish 1st Division. The last two teams were the bottom two from the 2015-16 Danish Superliga.

In the second round, there were 56 teams. 48 of them are winners from the first round with 6 teams from the 2015-16 Danish Superliga. The last teams were the top two from the 2015-16 Danish 1st Division.

In the third round, there will be 32 teams. 28 are winners from the second round. The last teams are the top four from the 2015-16 Danish Superliga.

The remainder of the competition will be in a "knockout" format.

Participants
107 teams are part of DBU Pokalen. All division team from the season 2015-16 is automatically Cup while enrolled seriehold played qualifying matches to come. FC Vestsjælland did not participate in the cup following a bankruptcy declaration.

2016-17 Danish Superliga

2016-17 bet25 Liga

2016–17 Danish 2nd Divisions

DBU Bornholm

DBU Funen

DBU Jutland

DBU Copenhagen

DBU Lolland-Falster

DBU Zealand

First round
In the first round of the DBU Cup, the 94 teams are divided into a Western and Eastern Pool.  The West Pool featured 50 teams, divided into three separate pools (North, Central and South/Funen Pool).  The Eastern Pool of 44 teams was divided into two pools (Zealand/Lolland/Falster Pool and Zealand/Copenhagen/Bornholm Pool).

The First Round draw took place on Friday, 23 June 2016.

West, Northern Pool

West, Central Pool

West, Southern/Funen Pool

East, Zealand/Lolland/Falster Pool

East, Zealand/Copenhagen/Bornholm Pool

Second round
In the second round the bottom six teams from the 2015-16 Superliga and the top two teams from the 2015-16 1st Division enter the competition. Together with the 48 winners from the first round, there will be a total of 56 teams in this round.

The teams are divided into two equal groups, East and West. Since there were more West teams than East team, the three DBU Funen teams, Dalum IF, BK Marienlyst and Otterup B&IK were moved into the East Group.

The draw took place on Friday. 12 August 2016  with matches played on 30 August and 31 August 2016. The draw was organized so that clubs in the Superliga could not meet each other.

West

East

Third round
In the third round the top four teams from the 2016–17 Danish Superliga enter the competition, and together with the 28 winners from the second round, there will be 32 teams in this round.

The draw is organized so that clubs in the Super League can not face each other.

The draw took place on Friday. 9 September 2016.

Fourth round
The draw took place on Friday, November 4, 2016.

Quarter-finals
The Quarter-final draw took place on Friday, March 17, 2017.

Semi-finals
The DBU changed the Semi-final format this season.  Instead of a two-leg aggregate, the semi-finals will just be played as a single match.
The Semi-final draw was held on April 7, 2017.

Final

References

External links
 

Danish Cup seasons
Danish
Cup